White olive may refer to:

 Canarium album, a fruit used in Southeast-Asian cuisines
 Terminalia arbuscula, a plant native to Jamaica